The 2021 Campeonato Paraense was the 109th edition of Pará's top professional football league. The competition started on 27 February and ended on 23 May. Paysandu won the championship for the 49th time.

Format
Three groups with four clubs, with the teams of one group facing those of the other two. The top two in each group advance to the final stage, along with the top two placed third. The matches of the quarter-finals, semi-finals, third place play-off and the finals will be played on a home-and-away two-legged basis.

The two worst teams in the overall standings will be relegated to the 2022 Campeonato Paraense Second Division.

The champion and the best placed team not qualified via CBF ranking qualify to the 2022 Copa Verde. The champion, the runner-up and the 3rd-placed team qualify to the 2022 Copa do Brasil. The best two teams who isn't on Campeonato Brasileiro Série A, Série B or Série C qualifies to 2022 Campeonato Brasileiro Série D.

Participating teams

Group stage

Group A

Group B

Group C

Final stage

Quarter-finals

Remo won 4–1 on aggregate and advanced to the semi-finals.

Tuna Luso won 3–1 on aggregate and advanced to the semi-finals.

Paysandu won 1–0 on aggregate and advanced to the semi-finals.

Castanhal won 3–2 on aggregate and advanced to the semi-finals.

Semi-finals

Tied 2–2 on aggregate, Tuna Luso won on penalties and advanced to the finals.

Tied 1–1 on aggregate, Paysandu won on penalties and advanced to the finals.

Third place play-off

Finals

Paysandu won 6–5 on aggregate.

References

Pará
Campeonato Paraense